This is a list of notable events in country music that took place in the year 1956.

Events
 January 30 — Despite a 4-inch snowstorm, 17,000 fans attend a Coliseum concert in Denver, Colorado. On the bill are Webb Pierce, Red Foley, the Foggy River Boys, Ray Price, Floyd Cramer, Roy Hill, the Echo Valley Boys and others.
 March 15 — Colonel Tom Parker becomes manager of Elvis Presley.
 March 22 — Carl Perkins is seriously injured in a car accident near Wilmington, Delaware, while en route to perform on The Perry Como Show.
 November 10 — George Jones is named the most promising country and western artist, according to Billboard magazine's annual nationwide disc jockey poll. Elvis Presley is the most played C&W artist.

No dates
 Although he already has had one No. 1 hit (with "I Forgot to Remember to Forget") and several other smaller-scale hits, Elvis Presley's national star power explodes when "Heartbreak Hotel" soars to the top of all three of Billboard's country charts by the end of March. The song also completes a rare feat by topping each of the Billboard pop and Hot R&B/Hip-Hop Songs charts.
 With release of Ray Price's "Crazy Arms", the 4/4 shuffle is established and would transform country music, especially honky tonk.

Top hits of the year

Number one hits

United States
(as certified by Billboard)

Notes
1^ No. 1 song of the year, as determined by Billboard.
2^ Song dropped from No. 1 and later returned to top spot.
A^ First Billboard No. 1 hit for that artist.
B^ Only Billboard No. 1 hit for that artist.

Note: Several songs were simultaneous No. 1 hits on the separate "Most Played C&W in Juke Boxes," "Most Played C&W by Jockeys" and "C&W Best Sellers in Stores" charts.

Other major hits

Top new album releases

Births
 January 18 — Mark Collie, country artist of the early 1990s.
 March 26 — Charly McClain, country vocalist of the early-to-mid-1980s.
 June 19 — Doug Stone, popular country vocalist during the early- to mid-1990s.
 July 6 — John Jorgenson, member of The Desert Rose Band.
 July 26 — Scott Hendricks, record producer (Restless Heart, Blake Shelton)
 August 12 — Danny Shirley, lead singer of Confederate Railroad
 September 22 — Debby Boone, granddaughter of Red Foley who enjoyed country success of her own in the late 1970s and early 1980s.
 October 23 — Dwight Yoakam, neotraditionalist since the mid-1980s who helped revitalize interest in the Bakersfield Sound.
 December 9 — Sylvia, pop-styled female vocalist of the early-1980s who became best known as "Sylvia."
 December 18 – Ron White, comedian, member of Blue Collar Comedy with Jeff Foxworthy, Bill Engvall, and Larry the Cable Guy
 December 21 — Lee Roy Parnell, alternative country star who enjoyed mainstream country success during the mid-1990s.
 December 30 — Suzy Bogguss, folk-styled country artist who rose to fame in the early 1990s.

Deaths

References

Further reading
Kingsbury, Paul, "Vinyl Hayride: Country Music Album Covers 1947–1989," Country Music Foundation, 2003
Millard, Bob, "Country Music: 70 Years of America's Favorite Music," HarperCollins, New York, 1993
Whitburn, Joel. "Top Country Songs 1944–2005 – 6th Edition." 2005.

Other links
Country Music Association

Country
Country music by year